Rhonda Smith is a Canadian bassist, best known for her work with Prince and Jeff Beck.

Biography 
Smith was born in Halifax, Nova Scotia, Canada. Her family moved to Montreal when she was a child. She and her three siblings were encouraged to play music and she began playing baritone horn, keyboards, guitar, and eventually electric bass. In addition to taking private classical training on upright bass, Smith attended McGill University in Montreal studying jazz performance. After gaining some experience in the local rock scene, she moved on to work with Canadian artists Claude Dubois, Daniel Lavoie, Robert Charlebois and James Blovin. She won a Juno award for "Best Contemporary Jazz Album", for her work with Jim Hillman and The Merlin Factor.

While attending a music convention in Germany, Smith met Sheila E. and gave her a press kit after learning Prince was putting a new band together. Two months later, Prince called and Smith went to Paisley Park to record on the Emancipation album. Smith recorded and toured with Prince for almost 10 years. Other musicians she has worked with include Chaka Khan, Beyoncé, T.I., Erykah Badu, Lee Ritenour, Jeff Beck, and Terri Lyne Carrington. 

In 2000, she released her first solo record, Intellipop.

Discography
 Intellipop (2000)
 RS2 (2006)
 Won't come back (2021)
 Won't come back Remix featuring TROY NoKA (2022)

with the New Power Generation
 Newpower Soul - 1998

References

External links
Official website

Living people
Canadian bass guitarists
Women bass guitarists
Musicians from Halifax, Nova Scotia
Year of birth missing (living people)